Ban Kluay station is a railway station located in Tha Rap Subdistrict, Ratchaburi City, Ratchaburi.

Train services 
 Ordinary 251/252 Bang Sue Junction-Prachuap Khiri Khan-Bang Sue Junction
 Ordinary 254 Lang Suan-Thon Buri
 Ordinary 351/352 Thon Buri-Ratchaburi-Thon Buri

References 

Railway stations in Thailand